Sopp may refer to:

 bread soaked in milk
 Adam Sopp (born 1986), British actor
 Austin Sopp (born 1994), known as Austin Gunn, American professional wrestler
 Colten Sopp (born 1991), known as Colten Gunn, American professional wrestler
 Monty Sopp, better known as Billy Gunn (born 1963), American professional wrestler and father of Austin and Colten
 Olav Johan Sopp (1860–1931), Norwegian mycologist